Okpogho is one of the most ancient cities in Africa located in Enugu State of Nigeria. Okpogho is well known for her distinguished strides in iron smelting which ended the world's trade by barter system. The originality of Okpogho could be traced from earlier ancestor called Ezeanyanwu. The communities that make up the Okpogho kingdom are

 Imezi Okpogho
 Ukwuagba Okpogho
 Okube Okpogho
 Ngbuta Okpogho and
 Mbanito Okpogho.

The people of Okpogho displayed exceptional creative abilities, as they settled in distinct regions of a place which is now referred to as Ezeagu, a local government area in Enugu state.

Population 
The last known population of Okppgho was 342,800 (2015) which is about 0.188% of the Nigeria population. If population growth rate would be same as in period 1991-2015 (+5.05%/year), Okpogho population in 2021 would be: 460 636*.

Demographics 
Okpogho is generally populated by the Igbo people..

Infrastructure

Education 
The People of Okpogho loves Education and focuses on early child Education at all cost usually born partly by the community and the government on the other part. The community provided resources such as transportation means to convey pupils to school as well as structures for academic excellence.

Religion 
Okpogho people like other South-Eastern Nigerians are predominantly Christians. Other non-religious faiths like Traditionalism and Habalism are strongly practiced by a very few minority that still hold strongly to ancient believes and faith. Roman Catholic is the dominant Christian faith practiced in Okpogho.

Okpogho Youth General Assembly (OYGA) 

Okpogho Youth General Assembly - (OYGA) was formed following an uprising within the Okpogho community, the youth in demonstration poor infrastructure and to seek government attention aimed at uniting all able-bodied youth in the community formed a strong YOUTH ORGANIZATION under the leadership of Mr. Sylvester Enezu and Mr. Tochukwu Ucheama.

On 21 August 2021, The Okpogho Youths General Association (OYGA) under the able leadership of Mr. Sylvester Enezu successfully galvanized the Community youths from all over the country and in diaspora for the epoch making maiden meeting held in Okpogho Mbanito - the ancestral land and original settlement of the Okpogho Kingdom comprising the five Communities - Imezi Okpogho, Ukwuagba Okpogho, Okube Okpogho, Ngbuta Okpogho and Mbanito Okpogho. The new youth organ (OYGA) vowed to change the narrative of sitting and waiting for the government. The 21st August 2021 meeting reviewed the Agricultural endowment and potentials that have been abandoned, her rich minerals, and the pitiable state of her roads as well as other basic amenities. On this stance, a Clarion call was made to for development funds, and over 2 million Naira was instantly raised and donations to continue even after the meeting.

The Odo Society 
The Odo masquerade society is an ancient culture practiced by the people of Opkogho from the past to the present. Odo is not pertinent to the people of Okpogho as it is also practiced by most ancient kingdoms within the Udi and Ezeagu people. The Odo festival provides a heritage that sees every men and women of Okpogho unite under the umbrella of a rich culture during which the dead are believed to walk among the living, interceding and reuniting temporarily with their families. The initiation into the cult would see every young male of Okpogho undergo three(3) initiation stages namely:

 "Iba N'uno" - Presentation to the clan, Child naming ceremony.
 "Ifu N'Ama" - Presentation to the community, and first introductory sacrifice to the Odo society.
 "Ite` Odo" - Joining the Odo cult proper which is often performed in two sessions, name-masked as "Igbu Awo"
 
Most of the activities of the Odo society requires secrecy.

References

External links
1991 Census on Nigeria

Cities in Enugu State